Jay Waldo Monteith,  (June 24, 1903 – December 19, 1981) was a Canadian politician.

Born in Stratford, Ontario, the son of Joseph Dunsmore Monteith, an Ontario MPP and cabinet minister, and Allice Chowen, he graduated from the University of Toronto and became a chartered accountant in 1932. He was first elected to the House of Commons of Canada in 1953 as a Progressive Conservative Member of Parliament for the riding of Perth, Ontario. He was re-elected in 1957, 1958, 1962, 1963, 1965, and 1968.

From 1957 to 1963, he was the Minister of National Health and Welfare. From 1961 to 1963, he was also the Minister of Amateur Sport.
He famously remarked to Lester Pearson that 'you must be nuts!' after Pearson presumed to ask Tories to give up their fight to keep Canada's Red Ensign.

References
 
 Jay Waldo Monteith fonds, Library and Archives Canada.

External links
 

1903 births
1981 deaths
Members of the House of Commons of Canada from Ontario
Members of the King's Privy Council for Canada
Progressive Conservative Party of Canada MPs
University of Toronto alumni
People from Stratford, Ontario
Canadian Ministers of Health and Welfare